"Shake Israel's Security", commonly known as "Attack, Do Terror Attacks" , is a propaganda song produced by the Izz al-Din al-Qassam Brigades, Hamas' military wing, during the 2014 Israel–Gaza conflict. It became a humorous hit in Israel and many parodic cover versions were produced in response.

The song was originally written in Arabic and published in 2012. Due to its success in the Arab world, the song was translated into Hebrew in 2014, as a part of a propaganda campaign by Hamas during the 2014 Israel-Gaza conflict. This version, just like the Arab version encourages attacks against Israel. The song became a humorous hit in Israel.

The song was removed from YouTube as a violation of its policies prohibiting hate speech and glorification of terrorism.

References

External links 
A copy of the original video on Ynetnews
A copy of the Arabic version, on YouTube
A spoof version in response, on YouTube
Another parody version, on YouTube

2014 singles
Hamas
Propaganda songs
Songs about Israel